("Peasant Jealousies") is a dramma giocoso in three acts by Giuseppe Sarti. The libretto was by Tommaso Grandi. It was also known as Il feudatorio, Il feudatorio burlato and I contadini bizzari. It was also set by Pasquale Anfossi.

Performance history

It was first performed at the Teatro San Samuele in Venice in November 1776. Like many of Sarti's other operas, it was extremely popular and was regularly produced during the last quarter of the 18th century. It was given at the Burgtheater in Vienna from 8 October 1777 and in Livorno from 26 December the same year. The first performance in London was at the King's Theatre on 15 April 1784.

Roles

Synopsis

The opera is a satire about the amorous relationships between a marquis and a number of peasant girls on his estate.

References
 
 Gelosie villane, Le by Mary Hunter, in 'The New Grove Dictionary of Opera', ed. Stanley Sadie (London, 1992) 

Operas
Italian-language operas
Drammi giocosi
Operas by Giuseppe Sarti
1776 operas